The Caribbean Broadcast Network (CBN) is the local television station for Road Town, and the rest of the British Virgin Islands. Owned locally by Caribbean Broadcast Network (BVI) Limited, the station broadcasts a 24-hour schedule of local entertainment, news, sports and religious programming, along with infomercials and movies.

CBN was founded in 2005 as ZBTV; not much else is known about the station under that name.

References

External links 
 

Television stations in the British Virgin Islands